Motion design may refer to:
Motion graphic design, designing the motion of graphics
Interactive design, designing for interactivity via user motion